José Luis Calderón Morales (born 10 July 1993) is a Mexican professional footballer who plays as a defender for Primera División club Once Deportivo.

External links
 
 

1993 births
Living people
Mexican footballers
Atlante F.C. footballers
Pioneros de Cancún footballers
Irapuato F.C. footballers
C.D. Tepatitlán de Morelos players
Inter Playa del Carmen players
Liga MX players
Liga Premier de México players
Footballers from Veracruz
Association football defenders